The Against Malaria Foundation (AMF) is a United-Kingdom based charity that provides long-lasting insecticidal nets (LLINs) to populations at high risk of malaria, primarily in Africa. As of December 2021, the foundation has raised $425 million, and distributed or committed to fund more than 137 million LLINs[4] since its founding in 2004. By the end of 2021, the organization had completed the distribution of 36.3 million nets to protect 65.3 million people in the Democratic Republic of Congo, Togo and Uganda.

Nets are distributed through partnerships with the International Red Cross, the Malaria Consortium, and others, with partners responsible for the costs of distribution. Distributions include malaria education for the local population, and they are documented through reports, photos, and video. Post-distribution check-ups are carried out 6, 12, 18, 24, and 30 months to assess net usage and conditions.

AMF has eight trustees and an advisory committee drawn from malaria experts around the world.
The charity is registered in the United Kingdom and governed by the laws of England and Wales. It is also registered in the US, Germany, Canada, Japan, and other countries.

History 

The World Swim Against Malaria was the brainchild of Rob Mather, a London-based strategy consultant. Mather had earlier organized a swim to raise money for a two-year-old girl who was badly burned in a house fire. Held in December 2003, the "Swim for Terri" started as a three-person fundraiser and grew to include 10,000 swimmers in 73 countries.

AMF is rated as a highly cost-effective charity by GiveWell. AMF was chosen as one of GiveWell's two highest-recommended charities (along with the Schistosomiasis Control Initiative) in 2011 and has continued to be recommended by GiveWell since then. GiveWell estimates that AMF's bed net program costs about US$3000–5000 per life saved.

Partners and supporters 
AMF is supported by more than 100 corporations. AMF's founding partners are PwC, Citigroup, Speedo, Microsoft, Allen & Overy, Attenda, Vestergaard Frandsen, and Sumitomo Chemical. Speedo also partnered with AMF's precursor organization, World Swim Against Malaria, and continues to raise money for bednets through swimming events.

AMF's principal distribution partners are Concern Universal, IMA World Health, and Episcopal Relief & Development.

In March 2023, AMF reached a milestone of fundraising $500 million thanks to 919,371 donations from 185,318 people in 189 countries.

References

External links 
 
 
 World Swim Against Malaria
 Against Malaria Foundation GiveWell's assessment of the Against Malaria Foundation. Includes extensive details about the organization's administration, funding, transparency, and effectiveness.
 The Life You Can Save Website for Peter Singer's book The Life You Can Save
 Against Malaria Foundation Ntcheu case study Giving What We Can's an account of AMF's distribution in Ntcheu, Malawi, including details of AMF's guiding principles and methodology

Malaria organizations
Charities based in London
 Health charities in the United Kingdom
Organizations associated with effective altruism